Extreme II: Pornograffitti (also known as simply Pornograffiti) is the second studio album by the heavy metal band Extreme, released on August 7, 1990 through A&M Records. The album title is a portmanteau of pornography and graffiti.

Extreme II sold very well, peaking at No. 10 on the Billboard 200, and was certified double platinum in the U.S. by the RIAA. It is the band's best selling album. Two singles from Pornograffiti, "More Than Words" and "Hole Hearted", reached No. 1 and 4 respectively on the Billboard Hot 100. Two other tracks, "Decadence Dance" and "Get the Funk Out", became popular on MTV's Headbangers Ball.

Overview
Pornograffitti is a concept album, its story is about lost innocence and uneasiness.
Though the album "[focuses] on the same funk-metal vibe as [their debut]", it became massively popular due to the acoustic single "More Than Words".

According to authors HP Newquist and Pete Prown, the album has "a bewildering array of song styles—heavy metal, ballads, funk, etc.".

Reception
The album received largely positive reception. AllMusic reviewer Steve Huey gave the album four stars, and commented that "[the] band shows a strong desire to experiment and push the boundaries of the pop-metal format". Rolling Stone placed the album at thirteenth on their list of the "50 Greatest Hair Metal Albums of All Time". Ultimate Classic Rock ranked it at eighth in their "Top 30 Glam Metal Albums". Heavy metal author Martin Popoff, in his book The Big Book of Hair Metal, called the album, "a thinking man's hair metal album, with thoughtful lyrics and tasteful guitar work".

Lead guitarist Nuno Bettencourt garnered admiration from rock guitar enthusiasts, as he was voted "Best New Talent" in a 1991 readers' poll by Guitar World magazine, and that magazine later named him "Most Valuable Player" of 1991.

Legacy
In 2010, after the band's reunion in the previous years, rumors started about possible commemorative shows given the 20th anniversary of the record. In 2012, the band played the entire album for four tour dates in Japan. In January 2014, the band confirmed they would be performing Pornograffiti in its entirety on their 2014 Europe and UK tour.

In 2015, the band embarked on an extensive US tour commemorating the album's 25th anniversary.

Track listing

Personnel
Extreme
 Gary Cherone - lead and backing vocals
 Nuno Bettencourt - guitars, piano, percussion, backing vocals
 Pat Badger - bass, backing vocals
 Paul Geary - drums, percussion
Additional musicians
 Barbara Glynn - backing vocals in "Decadence Dance"
 Pat Travers - backing vocals on "Get the Funk Out"
 Jeanine Moultrine -  backing vocals in "Suzi (Wants Her All Day What?)"
 Dweezil Zappa - intro/outro lead guitar in "He-Man Woman Hater"
 Li'l Jack Horn Section in "Li'l Jack Horny", "Get the Funk Out"
 Bob Findley, trumpet
 Chuck Findley, trumpet
 Bill Watrous, trombone
 Dick "Slyde" Hyde, bass trombone
 Pete Christlieb, tenor sax
 Joel Peskin, tenor sax

Charts

Weekly charts

Year-end charts

Certifications

References 

1990 albums
Albums produced by Michael Wagener
A&M Records albums
Concept albums
Extreme (band) albums
Funk metal albums